Periférico Belenes is the seventeenth station of Line 3 of the Guadalajara light rail from south-east to north-west, and the second in the opposite direction.

This station is located on the crossing of Juan Pablo II Av. from Zapopan (earlier on Laureles Av.) with the Periférico Ring that surrounds the Guadalajara metropolitan area.  The construction works of this station required completely closing vehicular traffic during 13 weekends. Earlier on, it was planned to build this station a little forward than what it currently is in direction to Zapopan Centro, but due to the planning of the Peribús (renamed as Mi Macro Periférico), it was decided to build the station near the Periférico Ring and from it the station takes the name. 

The girder placed on the Northwest Periférico Ring is one of the biggest of the First Viaduct; given the dimensions and weight of the girders between the Arcos de Zapopan and Periférico Belenes stations, it was necessary to do a total closure of the way on Monday 20, March 2017 to maneuver with two cranes of 250 tons and another one of a little over 500 tons in order to place said girders of 200 and 166 tons respectively.

Its logotype is a stylized picture of the facade of the "Jalisco State Public Library Juan José Arreola".

It currently has a connection with Mi Macro Periférico.

Points of interest 

 Zapopan DIF system
 Belenes Industrial Park
 Gran Terraza Belenes Mall

Transport routes 

 Mi Macro Periférico: Periférico Belenes
 SITREN Line 4
 T16B

References 

Guadalajara light rail system Line 3 stations
Railway stations in Zapopan
Railway stations opened in 2020